Millard Creek is a tributary of Tunkhannock Creek in Susquehanna County, Pennsylvania. The creek is not designated as an impaired waterbody. The surficial geology in its vicinity includes Wisconsinan Till, alluvium, wetlands, lakes, bedrock, and alluvial fan. The dominant land uses in the creek's watershed include forested land and agricultural land. A number of bridges have been constructed over the creek. Its drainage basin is designated as a Coldwater Fishery and a Migratory Fishery.

Course
Millard Creek begins in a small unnamed pond to the south of a wetland in Harford Township. It flows south-southwest for a few tenths of a mile before turning south-southeast for several tenths of a mile, entering Lenox Township. Here, the creek turns south-southwest for several tenths of a mile before turning east and then southeast and then south-southwest. After several tenths of a mile, it passes through a wetland and a lake before turning south. For the next several tenths of a mile, it flows alongside Jeffers Hill before passing through a wetland and Jeffers Pond. The creek then turns southwest for a short distance before turning south-southeast. After several tenths of a mile, it passes through another wetland and turns southeast for a few tenths of a mile before receiving an unnamed tributary from the left. It then turns south for several tenths of a mile, beginning to flow alongside Pennsylvania Route 167 on one side and Hickory Ridge on the other side. The creek then turns southeast for a few tenths of a mile before turning east-southeast and crossing Pennsylvania Route 92. A short distance further downstream, it reaches its confluence with Tunkhannock Creek.

Hydrology
Millard Creek is not designated as an impaired waterbody.

Annually,  comes from cropland,  comes from groundwater,  comes from hay/pastures/grass, and  comes from deciduous forest.

Point source pollution does not contribute any nitrogen, phosphorus, or sediment to Millard Creek.

Geography and geology

The geology in the entire watershed of Millard Creek consists of interbedded sedimentary rock of the Catksill Formation.

The surficial geology in the vicinity of Millard Creek mostly consists of a till known as Wisconsinan Till. However, patches of alluvium, wetlands, and lakes occur along some areas of the creek and the surficial geology on some nearby hills include bedrock consisting of sandstone and shale. There is also a patch of alluvial fan near the mouth of the creek.

Watershed
The stream is entirely within the United States Geological Survey quadrangle of Lenoxville. Its mouth is located within  of Glenwood.

The watershed of Millard Creek is relatively long in a north-south direction and relatively narrow in an east-west direction.

History
Millard Creek was entered into the Geographic Names Information System on August 2, 1979. Its identifier in the Geographic Names Information System is 1181198.

In 2001, Millard Creek was used as the reference watershed for the total maximum daily load for South Branch Wyalusing Creek.

Biology
The drainage basin of Millard Creek is designated as a Coldwater Fishery and a Migratory Fishery. The designated use of the creek is aquatic life.

See also
East Branch Tunkhannock Creek, next tributary of Tunkhannock Creek going downstream
Tower Branch, next tributary of Tunkhannock Creek going upstream
List of rivers of Pennsylvania

References

External links
Image of Millard Creek

Rivers of Susquehanna County, Pennsylvania
Tributaries of Tunkhannock Creek
Rivers of Pennsylvania